Beyond the Hill is a 2012 Turkish drama film directed by Emin Alper.

Cast 
 Tamer Levent as Faik
 Reha Özcan as Nusret
 Mehmet Özgür as Mehmet 
 Berk Hakman as Zafer

Awards
 Asia Pacific Screen Award for Best Feature Film (2012)
 Special Jury Prize (Sarajevo Film Festival) (2012)

References

External links 

2012 drama films
2012 films
Turkish drama films
Films directed by Emin Alper